The Tramway Bridge is a grade II listed pedestrian bridge crossing the River Avon at Stratford-upon-Avon, Warwickshire, England.

The bridge was built in 1823, originally to carry a tramway track of the horse-drawn Stratford and Moreton Tramway. It was  designed by John Urpeth Rastrick. It consists of eight elliptical arches, and is made from brick, with ashlar-coped parapets.

The tramway had fallen into disuse by 1904, and the track was lifted in 1918. It has since then been used a public footbridge, and is an important element in the landscape around the Royal Shakespeare Theatre. The bridge gained grade II listing in 1951.

Two further relics of the old tramway are located immediately to the north of the bridge: An old toll house known as Tramway House at the northern end of the bridge which is also grade II listed.

References

Buildings and structures in Stratford-upon-Avon
Bridges in Warwickshire
Grade II listed bridges in Warwickshire
Bridges completed in 1823
Arch bridges in the United Kingdom